Bombay Sweets is an Indian sweet manufacturer and eatery based in Thanjavur, Tamil Nadu. It is most noted for its Dry Gulabjamoon, Chandra Kala & Surya Kala.

History 
Bombay Sweets was established in 1950 in Thanjavur in South Indian state of Tamil Nadu. Its founder was Gurudayal Sharma who wanted to produce Dry Gulabjamoon, Chandra Kala & Surya Kala in 1950 when Tamil Nadu was only familiar with Mysorepak, Halwa, Laddu, Badusha & Jangiri. After Mr. Gurudayal Sharma, his son B.G. Subramani Sharma is maintaining the standards and policies of Bombay Sweets. Bombay Sweets has outlets in the Thanjavur and Pattukottai .

References

External links 
 

Confectionery companies of India
Companies based in Tamil Nadu
Indian companies established in 1950
1950 establishments in Madras State
Food and drink companies established in 1950